The Gay Swordsman is a 1950 Italian historical adventure film directed by Riccardo Freda and starring Carlo Ninchi, Gianna Maria Canale and Franca Marzi.

Synopsis
The son of d'Artagnan, the hero of The Three Musketeers, does not wish to follow in his father's footsteps and retires to a monastery. However, when a crime is committed in front of him he feels compelled to become involved. Here he meets the Duke of Bligny and Linda, a pastry chef, with whom he falls in love. Raoul offers to track down and have the mysterious knight punished; but he tries to have him killed without result and so he is accused of having stolen the plan of operations against the Flemings to have him sentenced to death. Raoul will blow up the enemy fortress that blocks the way of the troops and entering the fortress with the Duke Bligny discovers that the mysterious knight is a duke, military adviser to his father.

Cast
 Carlo Ninchi as Marshall D'Artagnan 
 Gianna Maria Canale as Linda 
 Franca Marzi as the Contessa
 Peter Trent as Duke de Malvoisin 
 Paolo Stoppa as Paolo 
 Piero Palermini as Raoul D'Artagnan 
 Enzo Fiermonte as Viscount di Langlass

Release
The Gay Swordsman was distributed theatrically in Italy by August Film on March 8, 1950. The film grossed a total of 201,000,000 Italian lire domestically.

The film was picked up for distribution overseas, with an article in the Los Angeles Times from November 1950 stating that Sol Lesser's company Principal Pictures International was going to import the film under the title of The Son of D'Artagnan.The film was only released in late 1953 in the United States on the bottom end of double bills with the title The Gay Swordsman.

Notes
 aOfficial ministry papers list the running time of the film as 102 minutes. Curti has described this as "highly unlikely", and stated the copy avilabale at the Spanish filmoteca ran at 86 minutes and had no signs of cuts.

References

Bibliography

External links 
 

1950 films
Italian historical adventure films
Italian black-and-white films
1950s historical adventure films
1950s Italian-language films
Films directed by Riccardo Freda
Films set in the 17th century
Films set in France
Films based on Twenty Years After
1950s Italian films